Allen Branch is a stream in Washington County, Missouri. It is a tributary of Fourche a Renault.

Allen Branch has the name of John Allen, the original owner of the site.

Course
Allen Branch rises approximately five miles south-southeast of the community of Shirley. The stream flows generally north passing under Missouri Route 8 past Shirley to join the Fourche a Renault about one half mile north of Shirley.

Watershed
Allen Branch drains  of area, receives about 42.7 in/year of precipitation, has a wetness index of 334.51, and is about 88% forested.

See also
List of rivers of Missouri

References

Rivers of Washington County, Missouri
Rivers of Missouri
Upper Mississippi water resource region